Hélène Vainqueur-Christophe (born 6 May 1956 in Trois-Rivières, Guadeloupe) is a French politician who was elected to the French National Assembly on 10 June 2012 (as the supplementary candidate for Victorin Lurel) representing the 4th constituency of the department of Guadeloupe.
She was re-elected in the 2017 election, but lost her seat in the 2022 legislative election to Élie Califer.

References

Living people
1956 births
French people of Guadeloupean descent
Guadeloupean politicians
Women members of the National Assembly (France)
Deputies of the 15th National Assembly of the French Fifth Republic
21st-century French women politicians
Socialist Party (France) politicians
Black French politicians
People from Trois-Rivières, Guadeloupe